Antaheen Jatra is an Assamese language film directed by Munna Ahmed. The film is based on a story by Jnanpith Award winner Mamoni Raisom Goswami. The film was screened at the Calcutta International Film Festival along with films from France, Czechoslovakia, China, Portugal, Vietnam, Canada, Norway, Italy and Bangladesh.

Casts
Nipon Goswami
Bishnu Kharghoria
Tapan Das
Prastuti Parashar
Zerifa Wahid
Shantichaya Roy
Atul Pachani
Taufique Rahman
Baharul Islam
Antara Chowdhury
child-artiste Gargi

Soundtrack

The soundtrack of the film was composed by Dr. Hitesh Baruah. Unliked his previous ventures, it only has three instrumental songs "Literature Masterpiece", "Writing Novels" and "Mamoni's Award Winning". Baruah reused few songs "Sunday Holiday Closing Day", "Kun Khorogor Jui" and "Morom Noir" from the film Maa Tumi Ananya as per the director's request, however, it did not featured in the film and was only appeared in the soundtrack album. This was Baruah's second film as a music director.

Note
 Track 1 to 3 does not appear in the film.

See also
Assamese cinema

References

2004 films
Films set in Assam
2000s Assamese-language films